Rudiloria is a genus of millipedes in the family Xystodesmidae, found in eastern North America.

Species
These species belong to the genus Rudiloria:
 Rudiloria charityae Marek, 2021
 Rudiloria guyandotta (Shear, 1972)
 Rudiloria kleinpeteri (Hoffman, 1949)
 Rudiloria mohicana Causey, 1955
 Rudiloria rigida (Shelley, 1986)
 Rudiloria trimaculata (Wood, 1864)
 Rudiloria tortua (Chamberlin, 1949)

References

Further reading

 
 

Polydesmida
Millipedes of North America